The United Nations Educational, Scientific and Cultural Organization (UNESCO) World Heritage Sites are places of importance to cultural or natural heritage as described in the UNESCO World Heritage Convention, established in 1972. Iran accepted the convention on 26 February 1975, making its historical sites eligible for inclusion on the list. As of 2021, twenty-six sites in Iran are included.

The first three sites in Iran, Meidan Naghshe Jahan, Isfahan, Persepolis and Tchogha Zanbil, were inscribed on the list at the 3rd Session of the World Heritage Committee, held in Cairo and Luxor, Egypt in 1979. They remained the Islamic Republic's only listed properties until 2003, when Takht-e Soleyman was added to the list. The latest addition was the Hyrcanian forests, inscribed in 2019.

In addition to its inscribed sites, Iran also lists more than 50 properties on its tentative list.

World Heritage Sites

 Site; named after the World Heritage Committee's official designation
 Location; at city, regional, or provincial level and geocoordinates
 Criteria; as defined by the World Heritage Committee
 Area; in hectares and acres. If available, the size of the buffer zone has been noted as well. A lack of value implies that no data has been published by UNESCO
 Year; during which the site was inscribed to the World Heritage List
 Description; brief information about the site, including reasons for qualifying as an endangered site, if applicable

Tentative list 
Iran (Persia) is a rich country in Culture, History and Natural heritage, home to one of the world's oldest civilizations, and known as Four Seasons Country.

In addition to sites inscribed on the World Heritage list, member states can maintain a list of tentative sites that they may consider for nomination. Nominations for the World Heritage list are only accepted if the site was previously listed on the tentative list. As of May 2020, Iran has 56 properties on UNESCO's tentative list.

References

 unesco-world-heritage-sites-Iran 

 01
Iran
World Heritage Sites
Landmarks in Iran
World Heritage Sites